Gaspard III de Coligny, duc de Châtillon, (1584 to 1646) was a French Huguenot, who served under Louis XIII, and was appointed Marshal of France in 1622. He was described as "a mediocre general, but absolutely loyal".

Life
Châtillon was born 26 July 1584, in Montpellier, son of François de Coligny (1557–1591) and his wife Marguerite d'Ailly. He was a grandson of the Huguenot leader Admiral Gaspard de Coligny.

On 13 August 1615, he married Anne de Polignac (1598–1651), and they had 4 children. Maurice (1618-1644),  (1620-1649), Henriette de Coligny (1618–1673), and Anne, (1624-1680).

Career

He served during the Franco-Spanish War (1635-1659) at Les Avins in 1635, and commanded the Army of Champagne at the Battle of La Marfée on 6 July, 1641, where he was defeated. He retired to Châtillon, where he died 4 January 1646.

Family tree

References

Sources
 

1584 births
1646 deaths
Military personnel from Montpellier
Dukes of Coligny
French military personnel of the Thirty Years' War
Military personnel of the Franco-Spanish War (1635–1659)
French generals
Marshals of France
Peers of France
Gaspard III